Junior Francisco Félix Sánchez (born ) is a Dominican former professional baseball player who played in Major League Baseball as an outfielder from –. Baseball records list his date of birth in October 1967, but the California Angels and Florida Marlins believed he was older, possibly by up to 10 years.

On May 4, 1989, Félix hit the first pitch he saw in the big leagues for a home run off Kirk McCaskill, but his Blue Jays lost 3–2 in 10 innings. He was the 27th American League player ever to homer in his first major league at-bat, and the 10th to do so on the first pitch.

In the same season on June 2, at Fenway Park, in Boston, Félix hit an inside the park grand slam.

On September 2, 1990, Félix caught the final out of the Blue Jays' first no-hitter, thrown by Dave Stieb.

References

External links

1967 births
California Angels players
Detroit Tigers players
Dominican Republic expatriate baseball players in Canada
Dominican Republic expatriate baseball players in South Korea
Dominican Republic expatriate baseball players in the United States
Edmonton Trappers players
Florida Marlins players

 Junior Félix at SABR (Baseball BioProject)

LG Twins players
Living people
Major League Baseball center fielders
Major League Baseball players from the Dominican Republic
Major League Baseball right fielders
Medicine Hat Blue Jays players
Ottawa Lynx players
Palm Springs Angels players
People from Laguna Salada
Syracuse SkyChiefs players
Toronto Blue Jays players
Myrtle Beach Blue Jays players
Knoxville Blue Jays players
Algodoneros de Unión Laguna players
Broncos de Reynosa players
Diablos Rojos del México players
Leones de Yucatán players
Dominican Republic expatriate baseball players in Mexico